Film Fandango is a weekly film discussion podcast hosted by comedians David Reed and Marek Larwood.

In its initial incarnation (October 2011 – January 2013), the podcast was hosted by Danielle Ward alongside David Reed and was distributed by Absolute Radio. Each week a guest presenter joined the hosts to discuss a new or upcoming cinema release as well as a film of his or her choosing. In October 2012, Larwood replaced Ward as host.

No longer affiliated with Absolute Radio, the show continues in a similar weekly format albeit with fewer guest presenters.

Episodes
A list of early episodes of Film Fandango is available on the podcast's iTunes page.
 Episode 1 - Isy Suttie on Three Musketeers 3D & Crimes and Misdemeanors
 Episode 2 - Matthew Crosby on The Ides of March & Caddy Shack
 Episode 3 - David Armand on Reel Steel & The Jerk
 Episode 4 - Colin Hoult on Tintin & Wilbur Wants to Kill Himself
 Episode 5 - Jessica Ransom on In Time & Bugsy Malone
 Episode 6 - Thom Tuck on The Rum Diary & Ring
 Episode 7 - John-Luke Roberts on Trespass & Brazil
 Episode 8 - Jon Holmes on Twilight: Breaking Dawn part 1 & Cannibal Apocalypse
 Episode 9 - Marek Larwood on Hugo & Young Sherlock Holmes
 Episode 10 - Humphrey Ker on The British Independent Film Awards & A Bridge Too Far
 Episode 11 - Dan Tetsell on Mission: Impossible – Ghost Protocol & Münchhausen
 Episode 12 - Christmas Special on Sherlock Holmes: A Game of Shadows & Films on TV over Christmas.
 Episode 13 - Thom Tuck on Films between Christmas and New Year.
 Episode 14 - Marek Larwood on the Best Films of 2011 and What to look out for in 2012.
 Episode 15 - Nadia Kamil on War Horse & Labyrinth
 Episode 16 - Tom Parry on Shame & The Untouchables
 Episode 17 - Matt Forde on Haywire & Dead Man's Shoes
 Episode 18 - Tiffany Stevenson on Man on a Ledge & Se7en
 Episode 19 - Ruth Bratt on The Woman In Black & The Artist
 Episode 20 - Richard Sandling on The Muppets & Sullivan's Travels
 Episode 21 - Rob Deering on Rampart & Mission: Impossible
 Episode 22 - Jim Bob on Contraband & Marathon Man
 Episode 23 - Dan Maier on Cleanskin & Fearless
 Episode 24 - Tiernan Douieb on John Carter & The Descent
 Episode 25 - Scroobius Pip on 21 Jump Street & Buffalo 66
 Episode 26 - Michael Legge on The Hunger Games & Belleville Rendez-Vous
 Episode 27 - Ben Clark on The Pirates! In an Adventure with Scientists & Oldboy
 Episode 28 - Humphrey Ker & Thom Tuck on Wrath of the Titans & How to Train Your Dragon
 Episode 29 - Bridget Christie on The Cabin in the Woods & The Changeling

References

External links
 

Audio podcasts
2011 podcast debuts
2018 podcast endings
Film and television podcasts